A relaxation technique (also known as relaxation training) is any method, process, procedure, or activity that helps a person to relax; to attain a state of increased calmness; or otherwise reduce levels of pain, anxiety, stress or anger.  Relaxation techniques are often employed as one element of a wider stress management program and can decrease muscle tension, lower the blood pressure and slow heart and breath rates, among other health benefits.

People respond to stress in different ways, namely, by becoming overwhelmed, depressed or both. Yoga, QiGong, Taiji, and Pranayama that includes deep breathing tend to calm people who are overwhelmed by stress, while rhythmic exercise improves the mental and physical health of those who are depressed. People who encounter both symptoms simultaneously, feeling depressed in some ways and overexcited in others, may do best by walking or performing yoga techniques that are focused on strength.

Background

Research has indicated that removing stress helps to increase a person's health.

Research released in the 1980s indicated stronger ties between stress and health and showed benefits from a wider range of relaxation techniques than had been previously known.  This research received national media attention, including a New York Times article in 1986.

Uses
People use relaxation techniques for the following reasons, among others:

 Anger management
 Anxiety attacks
 Cardiac health
 Childbirth
 Depression
 General well-being
 Headache
 High blood pressure
 Preparation for hypnosis
 Immune system support
 Insomnia
 Pain management
 Relaxation (psychology)
 Stress management
 Addiction treatment
 Nightmare disorder

Techniques

Various techniques are used by individuals to improve their state of relaxation.  Some of the methods are performed alone; some require the help of another person (often a trained professional); some involve movement, some focus on stillness; while other methods involve different elements.

Certain relaxation techniques known as "formal and passive relaxation exercises" are generally performed while sitting or lying quietly, with minimal movement and involve "a degree of withdrawal". These include:
 Autogenic training
 Biofeedback
 Deep breathing
 Guided imagery
 Hypnosis
 Meditation
 Pranayama
 Progressive muscle relaxation
 Qigong
 Transcendental Meditation technique
 Yoga Nidra
 Zen Yoga

Movement-based relaxation methods incorporate exercise such as walking, gardening, yoga, T'ai chi, Qigong, and more.  Some forms of bodywork are helpful in promoting a state of increased relaxation. Examples include massage, acupuncture, the Feldenkrais Method, myotherapy, reflexology and self-regulation.

Some relaxation methods can also be used during other activities, for example,  autosuggestion and prayer. At least one study has suggested that listening to certain types of music, particularly new-age music and classical music, can increase feelings associated with relaxation, such as peacefulness and a sense of ease.

A technique growing in popularity is flotation therapy, which is the use of a float tank in which a solution of Epsom salt is kept at skin temperature to provide effortless floating.  Research in USA and Sweden has demonstrated a powerful and profound relaxation after twenty minutes.  In some cases, floating may reduce pain and stress and has been shown to release endorphins.

Even actions as simple as a walk in the park have been shown to aid feelings of relaxation, regardless of the initial reason for the visit.

See also
 Biopsychosocial model

References

External links

Behavior therapy
Mindfulness (psychology)